The notion of a sovereign state arises in the 16th century with the development of modern diplomacy.
For earlier times, the term "sovereign state" is an anachronism. What corresponded to sovereign states in the medieval and ancient period were monarchs ruling By the Grace of God, de facto feudal or imperial autocrats, or de facto independent nations or tribal confederations.

Sovereign states

A
 Abbasid Caliphate
 Ailech
 Airgíalla
 Alania – Kingdom of Alania
 Alba – Kingdom of Alba
 Almería – Taifa of Almería
 Almohad Caliphate
 Alodia – Kingdom of Alodia
 Antioch – Principality of Antioch
 Aragon – Kingdom of Aragon
 Arcos – Taifa of Arcos
 Artsakh – Kingdom of Artsakh
 Armorica

B
Badajoz – Taifa of Badajoz
Barcelona – County of Barcelona
 Béarn – Viscounty of Béarn
Beja and Évora – Taifa of Beja and Évora
Bohemia – Duchy of Bohemia
Breifne – Kingdom of Briefne
 Brittany – Duchy of Brittany
Bumthang – Kingdom of Bumthang
Burgundy-Arles (Arelat) – Kingdom of Burgundy.
Butuan – Rajahnate of Butuan
 – Byzantine Empire

C
Cañari – Tribal Confederacy of Cañari
Carmona – Taifa of Carmona
Champa – Kingdom of Champa
China – Southern Song Dynasty
Cilicia – Armenian Kingdom of Cilicia
Connacht – Kingdom of Connacht
Constantina and Hornachuelos – Taifa of Constantina and Hornachuelos
Cork (City State)
Couto Misto
Cumania – Khanate of Cumania (Cuman-Kipchak Confederation)

D
 Deheubarth – Kingdom of Deheubarth
 Dénia – Taifa of Dénia
 Denmark – Kingdom of Denmark
 Derbent – Derbent Emirate
 Desmond – Kingdom of Desmond
 Dublin – Kingdom of Dublin

E
Edessa – County of Edessa
England – Kingdom of England
Ethiopia – Ethiopian Empire

F
 Fatimid – Fatimid Caliphate
 Flanders – County of Flanders
 France – Kingdom of France

G
 Galicia – Kingdom of Galicia (Reino de Galicia)
 Galilee – Principality of Galilee
 Galloway – Kingdom of Galloway
 Garhwal – Garhwal Kingdom (Tehri Garhwal)
 Gazikumukh Shamkhalate
 Georgia – Kingdom of Georgia
 Genoa – Republic of Genoa
 Ghana – Empire of Ghana (Ghanaian Empire / Awkar)
 Ghurid – Ghurid dynasty
 Granada – Taifa Kingdom of Granada
 Guelders – Duchy of Guelders
 Gwynedd – Kingdom of Gwynedd

H
Holy Roman Empire, a highly complex political entity which included:
Bavaria – Duchy of Bavaria
Lusatia – March of Lausitz
Montferrat – March of Montferrat
Verona – March of Verona
 Hungary – Kingdom of Hungary

I
 Iceland – Icelandic Free State

J
 Japan – Kamakura Shogunate
 Jerusalem – Kingdom of Jerusalem
Jin – Jin Empire

K
 Kanem – Kanem Empire
Kara-Khanid – Kara-Khanid Khanate
Khitans – Kingdom of Khitans
Kievan Rus' – Kievan Rus'
 Korea – Kingdom of Goryeo

L
 Leinster – Kingdom of Leinster
 León – Kingdom of León

M
 Málaga – Taifa of Málaga
 Mapungubwe – Kingdom of Mapungubwe
 Meath – Kingdom of Meath
 – Emirate of Morocco (ruled by the Almoravid dynasty)
 Murcia – Taifa of Murcia

N
 Navarre – Kingdom of Navarre
 Norway – Kingdom of Norway

O
 Osraige

P
Poland – Kingdom of Poland
 Portugal – Kingdom of Portugal
 Powys – Kingdom of Powys

S
Scotland – Kingdom of Scotland
Seljuk – Seljuk Empire
Serbia – Grand Principality of Serbia
Sicily – Kingdom of Sicily
Silves – Taifa of Silves
Sweden – Kingdom of Sweden
Syunik-Baghk – Kingdom of Syunik-Baghk

T
 Tavira – Taifa of Tavira
 Tejada – Taifa of Tejada
 Thomond – Kingdom of Thomond

U
 Ulaid

W
 Waterford (City State)
 Western Xia
 Wexford (City State)

Notes

1143
1143
Sov